In the mathematical field of algebraic topology, the homotopy groups of spheres describe how spheres of various dimensions can wrap around each other. They are examples of topological invariants, which reflect, in algebraic terms, the structure of spheres viewed as topological spaces, forgetting about their precise geometry. Unlike homology groups, which are also topological invariants, the homotopy groups are surprisingly complex and difficult to compute.

The -dimensional unit sphere — called the -sphere for brevity, and denoted as  — generalizes the familiar circle and the ordinary sphere.  The -sphere may be defined geometrically as the set of points in a Euclidean space of dimension  located at a unit distance from the origin. The -th homotopy group  summarizes the different ways in which the -dimensional sphere  can be mapped continuously into the  sphere . This summary does not distinguish between two mappings if one can be continuously deformed to the other; thus, only equivalence classes of mappings are summarized.  An "addition" operation defined on these equivalence classes makes the set of equivalence classes into an abelian group.

The problem of determining  falls into three regimes, depending on whether  is less than, equal to, or greater than :
Therefore the homotopy group is the trivial group.
This degree identifies the homotopy group  with the group of integers under addition. For example, every point on a circle can be mapped continuously onto a point of another circle; as the first point is moved around the first circle, the second point may cycle several times around the second circle, depending on the particular mapping. 
 The most interesting and surprising results occur when . The first such surprise was the discovery of a mapping called the Hopf fibration, which wraps the 3-sphere  around the usual sphere  in a non-trivial fashion, and so is not equivalent to a one-point mapping.

The question of computing the homotopy group  for positive  turned out to be a central question in algebraic topology that has contributed to development of many of its fundamental techniques and has served as a stimulating focus of research. These are called the stable homotopy groups of spheres and have been computed for values of  up to 64. The stable homotopy groups form the coefficient ring of an extraordinary cohomology theory, called stable cohomotopy theory. Most modern computations use spectral sequences, a technique first applied to homotopy groups of spheres by Jean-Pierre Serre. Several important patterns have been established, yet much remains unknown and unexplained.

Background
The study of homotopy groups of spheres builds on a great deal of background material, here briefly reviewed. Algebraic topology provides the larger context, itself built on topology and abstract algebra, with homotopy groups as a basic example.

-sphere 
An ordinary sphere in three-dimensional space — the surface, not the solid ball — is just one example of what a sphere means in topology. Geometry defines a sphere rigidly, as a shape. Here are some alternatives.
 Implicit surface: 
 This is the set of points in 3-dimensional Euclidean space found exactly one unit away from the origin. It is called the 2-sphere, for reasons given below. The same idea applies for any dimension ; the equation  produces the -sphere as a geometric object in -dimensional space. For example, the 1-sphere  is a circle.
 Disk with collapsed rim: written in topology as 
 This construction moves from geometry to pure topology. The disk  is the region contained by a circle, described by the inequality , and its rim (or "boundary") is the circle , described by the equality . If a balloon is punctured and spread flat it produces a disk; this construction repairs the puncture, like pulling a drawstring. The slash, pronounced "modulo", means to take the topological space on the left (the disk) and in it join together as one all the points on the right (the circle). The region is 2-dimensional, which is why topology calls the resulting topological space a 2-sphere. Generalized,  produces . For example,  is a line segment, and the construction joins its ends to make a circle. An equivalent description is that the boundary of an -dimensional disk is glued to a point, producing a CW complex.
 Suspension of equator: written in topology as 
 This construction, though simple, is of great theoretical importance. Take the circle  to be the equator, and sweep each point on it to one point above (the North Pole), producing the northern hemisphere, and to one point below (the South Pole), producing the southern hemisphere. For each positive integer , the -sphere  has as equator the -sphere , and the suspension  produces .

Some theory requires selecting a fixed point on the sphere, calling the pair  a pointed sphere. For some spaces the choice matters, but for a sphere all points are equivalent so the choice is a matter of convenience. For spheres constructed as a repeated suspension, the point , which is on the equator of all the levels of suspension, works well; for the disk with collapsed rim, the point resulting from the collapse of the rim is another obvious choice.

Homotopy group 

The distinguishing feature of a topological space is its continuity structure, formalized in terms of open sets or neighborhoods. A continuous map is a function between spaces that preserves continuity. A homotopy is a continuous path between continuous maps; two maps connected by a homotopy are said to be homotopic. The idea common to all these concepts is to discard variations that do not affect outcomes of interest. An important practical example is the residue theorem of complex analysis, where "closed curves" are continuous maps from the circle into the complex plane, and where two closed curves produce the same integral result if they are homotopic in the topological space consisting of the plane minus the points of singularity.

The first homotopy group, or fundamental group,  of a (path connected) topological space  thus begins with continuous maps from a pointed circle  to the pointed space , where maps from one pair to another map  into . These maps (or equivalently, closed curves) are grouped together into equivalence classes based on homotopy (keeping the "base point"  fixed), so that two maps are in the same class if they are homotopic. Just as one point is distinguished, so one class is distinguished: all maps (or curves) homotopic to the constant map  are called null homotopic. The classes become an abstract algebraic group with the introduction of addition, defined via an "equator pinch". This pinch maps the equator of a pointed sphere (here a circle) to the distinguished point, producing a "bouquet of spheres" — two pointed spheres joined at their distinguished point. The two maps to be added map the upper and lower spheres separately, agreeing on the distinguished point, and composition with the pinch gives the sum map.

More generally, the -th homotopy group,  begins with the pointed -sphere , and otherwise follows the same procedure. If for some  all maps are null homotopic, then the group  consists of one element, and is called the trivial group.

A continuous map between two topological spaces induces a group homomorphism between the associated homotopy groups. In particular, if the map is a continuous bijection (a homeomorphism), so that the two spaces have the same topology, then their -th homotopy groups are isomorphic for all . However, the real plane has exactly the same homotopy groups as a solitary point (as does a Euclidean space of any dimension), and the real plane with a point removed has the same groups as a circle, so groups alone are not enough to distinguish spaces. Although the loss of discrimination power is unfortunate, it can also make certain computations easier.

Low-dimensional examples
The low-dimensional examples of homotopy groups of spheres provide a sense of the subject, because these special cases can be visualized in ordinary 3-dimensional space. However, such visualizations are not mathematical proofs, and do not capture the possible complexity of maps between spheres.

The simplest case concerns the ways that a circle (1-sphere) can be wrapped around another circle. This can be visualized by wrapping a rubber band around one's finger: it can be wrapped once, twice, three times and so on.  The wrapping can be in either of two directions, and wrappings in opposite directions will cancel out after a deformation. The homotopy group  is therefore an infinite cyclic group, and is isomorphic to the group  of integers under addition: a homotopy class is identified with an integer by counting the number of times a mapping in the homotopy class wraps around the circle. This integer can also be thought of as the winding number of a loop around the origin in the plane.

The identification (a group isomorphism) of the homotopy group with the integers is often written as an equality: thus .

Mappings from a 2-sphere to a 2-sphere can be visualized as wrapping a plastic bag around a ball and then sealing it.  The sealed bag is topologically equivalent to a 2-sphere, as is the surface of the ball. The bag can be wrapped more than once by twisting it and wrapping it back over the ball. (There is no requirement for the continuous map to be injective and so the bag is allowed to pass through itself.) The twist can be in one of two directions and opposite twists can cancel out by deformation. The total number of twists after cancellation is an integer, called the degree of the mapping. As in the case mappings from the circle to the circle, this degree identifies the homotopy group with the group of integers, .

These two results generalize: for all ,   (see below).

Any continuous mapping from a circle to an ordinary sphere can be continuously deformed to a one-point mapping, and so its homotopy class is trivial. One way to visualize this is to imagine a rubber-band wrapped around a frictionless ball: the band can always be slid off the ball. The homotopy group is therefore a trivial group, with only one element, the identity element, and so it can be identified with the subgroup of  consisting only of the number zero. This group is often denoted by 0.  Showing this rigorously requires more care, however, due to the existence of
space-filling curves.

This result generalizes to higher dimensions. All mappings from a lower-dimensional sphere into a sphere of higher dimension are similarly trivial: if , then  .  This can be shown as a consequence of the cellular approximation theorem.

All the interesting cases of homotopy groups of spheres involve mappings from a higher-dimensional sphere onto one of lower dimension. Unfortunately, the only example which can easily be visualized is not interesting: there are no nontrivial mappings from the ordinary sphere to the circle. Hence, . This is because  has the real line as its universal cover which is contractible (it has the homotopy type of a point).

This map generates the homotopy group .

History
In the late 19th century Camille Jordan introduced the notion of homotopy and used the notion of a homotopy group, without using the language of group theory. A more rigorous approach was adopted by Henri Poincaré in his 1895 set of papers Analysis situs where the related concepts of homology and the fundamental group were also introduced.

Higher homotopy groups were first defined by Eduard Čech in 1932. (His first paper was withdrawn on the advice of Pavel Sergeyevich Alexandrov and Heinz Hopf, on the grounds that the groups were commutative so could not be the right generalizations of the fundamental group.) Witold Hurewicz is also credited with the introduction of homotopy groups in his 1935 paper and also for the Hurewicz theorem which can be used to calculate some of the groups.
An important method for calculating the various groups is the concept of stable algebraic topology, which finds properties that are independent of the dimensions. Typically these only hold for larger dimensions. The first such result was Hans Freudenthal's suspension theorem, published in 1937. Stable algebraic topology flourished between 1945 and 1966 with many important results. In 1953 George W. Whitehead showed that there is a metastable range for the homotopy groups of spheres. Others who worked in this area included José Adem, Hiroshi Toda, Frank Adams, J. Peter May, Mark Mahowald, Daniel Isaksen, Guozhen Wang, and Zhouli Xu. The stable homotopy groups  are known for  up to 90, and, as of 2023, unknown for larger .

General theory

The reason is that a continuous mapping from an -sphere to an -sphere with  can always be deformed so that it is not surjective.

It therefore came as a great surprise historically that the corresponding homotopy groups are not trivial in general.

Table
The following table gives an idea of the complexity of the higher homotopy groups even for spheres of dimension 8 or less. Extended tables of homotopy groups of spheres are given at the end of the article.

The first two rows of this table are straightforward.

Beyond these two rows, the higher homotopy groups appear to be chaotic, but in fact there are many patterns, some obvious and some very subtle.
 The groups below the jagged black line are constant along the diagonals (as indicated by the red, green and blue coloring).
 Most of the groups are finite.  The only infinite groups are either on the main diagonal or immediately above the jagged line (highlighted in yellow).
 The third and fourth rows of the table are the same starting in the third column (i.e.,  for ).  This isomorphism is induced by the Hopf fibration .
 For  and  the homotopy groups  do not vanish.
These patterns follow from many different theoretical results.

Stable and unstable groups
For , the groups are called the unstable homotopy groups of spheres.

Hopf fibrations
The classical Hopf fibration is a fiber bundle:

The general theory of fiber bundles  shows that there is a long exact sequence of homotopy groups

Thus the long exact sequence breaks into short exact sequences,

The Hopf fibration may be constructed as follows: pairs of complex numbers  with  form a 3-sphere, and their ratios  cover the complex plane plus infinity, a 2-sphere. The Hopf map  sends any such pair to its ratio.

Similarly, there are generalized Hopf fibrations

constructed using pairs of quaternions or octonions instead of complex numbers. Thus the long exact sequences again break into families of split short exact sequences, implying two families of relations.

Thus there can be no fibration

the first non-trivial case of the Hopf invariant one problem, because such a fibration would imply that the failed relation is true.

Framed cobordism

Homotopy groups of spheres are closely related to cobordism classes of manifolds.
Every map  is homotopic to a differentiable map with  a framed -dimensional submanifold. Until the advent of more sophisticated algebraic methods in the early 1950s (Serre) the Pontrjagin isomorphism was the main tool for computing the homotopy groups of spheres. In 1954 the Pontrjagin isomorphism was generalized by René Thom to an isomorphism expressing other groups of cobordism classes (e.g. of all manifolds) as homotopy groups of spaces and spectra. In more recent work the argument is usually reversed, with cobordism groups computed in terms of homotopy groups.

Finiteness and torsion
In particular the homotopy groups are determined by their -components for all primes . The 2-components are hardest to calculate, and in several ways behave differently from the -components for odd primes.

In the case of odd torsion there are more precise results; in this case there is a big difference between odd and even dimensional spheres. The -torsion of the intermediate group  can be strictly larger.

The results above about odd torsion only hold for odd-dimensional spheres: for even-dimensional spheres, the James fibration gives the torsion at odd primes  in terms of that of odd-dimensional spheres,

(where  means take the -component). This exact sequence is similar to the ones coming from the Hopf fibration; the difference is that it works for all even-dimensional spheres, albeit at the expense of ignoring 2-torsion. Combining the results for odd and even dimensional spheres shows that much of the odd torsion of unstable homotopy groups is determined by the odd torsion of the stable homotopy groups.

For stable homotopy groups there are more precise results about -torsion.

The J-homomorphism

, where  denotes the special orthogonal group. This period 8 pattern is known as Bott periodicity, and it is reflected in the stable homotopy groups of spheres via the image of the -homomorphism which is:
 a cyclic group of order 2 if  is congruent to 0 or 1 modulo 8;
 trivial if  is congruent to 2, 4, 5, or 6 modulo 8; and

Roughly speaking, the image of the -homomorphism is the subgroup of "well understood" or "easy" elements of the stable homotopy groups. These well understood elements account for most elements of the stable homotopy groups of spheres in small dimensions. Tables of homotopy groups of spheres sometimes omit the "easy" part  to save space.

Ring structure

The direct sum

of the stable homotopy groups of spheres is a supercommutative graded ring, where multiplication is given by composition of representing maps, and any element of non-zero degree is nilpotent; the nilpotence theorem on complex cobordism implies Nishida's theorem.

The Toda bracket is not quite an element of a stable homotopy group, because it is only defined up to addition of products of certain other elements. Hiroshi Toda used the composition product and Toda brackets to label many of the elements of homotopy groups. There are also higher Toda brackets of several elements, defined when suitable lower Toda brackets vanish. This parallels the theory of Massey products in cohomology.
Every element of the stable homotopy groups of spheres can be expressed using composition products and higher Toda brackets in terms of certain well known elements, called Hopf elements.

Computational methods
If  is any finite simplicial complex with finite fundamental group, in particular if  is a sphere of dimension at least 2, then its homotopy groups are all finitely generated abelian groups. To compute these groups, they are often factored into their -components for each prime , and calculating each of these -groups separately. The first few homotopy groups of spheres can be computed using ad hoc variations of the ideas above; beyond this point, most methods for computing homotopy groups of spheres are based on spectral sequences. This is usually done by constructing suitable fibrations and taking the associated long exact sequences of homotopy groups; spectral sequences are a systematic way of organizing the complicated information that this process generates.

"The method of killing homotopy groups", due to  involves repeatedly using the Hurewicz theorem to compute the first non-trivial homotopy group and then killing (eliminating) it with a fibration involving an Eilenberg–MacLane space. In principle this gives an effective algorithm for computing all homotopy groups of any finite simply connected simplicial complex, but in practice it is too cumbersome to use for computing anything other than the first few nontrivial homotopy groups as the simplicial complex becomes much more complicated every time one kills a homotopy group.
The Serre spectral sequence was used by Serre to prove some of the results mentioned previously. He used the fact that taking the loop space of a well behaved space shifts all the homotopy groups down by 1, so the th homotopy group of a space  is the first homotopy group of its-fold repeated loop space, which is equal to the first homology group of the -fold loop space by the Hurewicz theorem. The Serre spectral sequence relates the homology of a space to that of its loop space, so can sometimes be used to calculate the homology of loop spaces. The Serre spectral sequence tends to have many non-zero differentials, which are hard to control, and too many ambiguities appear for higher homotopy groups. Consequently, it has been superseded by more powerful spectral sequences with fewer non-zero differentials, which give more information.
 The EHP spectral sequence can be used to compute many homotopy groups of spheres; it is based on some fibrations used by Toda in his calculations of homotopy groups.
 The classical Adams spectral sequence has  term given by the Ext groups  over the mod  Steenrod algebra , and converges to something closely related to the -component of the stable homotopy groups. The initial terms of the Adams spectral sequence are themselves quite hard to compute: this is sometimes done using an auxiliary spectral sequence called the May spectral sequence.
At the odd primes, the Adams–Novikov spectral sequence is a more powerful version of the Adams spectral sequence replacing ordinary cohomology mod  with a generalized cohomology theory, such as complex cobordism or, more usually, a piece of it called Brown–Peterson cohomology. The initial term is again quite hard to calculate; to do this one can use the chromatic spectral sequence.

A variation of this last approach uses a backwards version of the Adams–Novikov spectral sequence for Brown–Peterson cohomology: the limit is known, and the initial terms involve unknown stable homotopy groups of spheres that one is trying to find.

The motivic Adams spectral sequence converges to the motivic stable homotopy groups of spheres. By comparing the motivic one over the complex numbers with the classical one, Isaksen gives rigorous proof of computations up to the 59-stem. In particular, Isaksen computes the Coker J of the 56-stem is 0, and therefore by the work of Kervaire-Milnor, the sphere  has a unique smooth structure.

The Kahn–Priddy map induces a map of Adams spectral sequences from the suspension spectrum of infinite real projective space to the sphere spectrum. It is surjective on the Adams  page on positive stems. Wang and Xu develops a method using the Kahn–Priddy map to deduce Adams differentials for the sphere spectrum inductively. They give detailed argument for several Adams differentials and compute the 60 and 61-stem.

The motivic cofiber of  method is so far the most efficient method at the prime 2. The class  is a map between motivic spheres. One can then pullback these motivic Adams differentials to the motivic sphere, and then use the Betti realization functor to push forward them to the classical sphere. Using this method,  computes up to the 90-stem.

For example, the Hopf map  corresponds to the Borromean rings.

Applications

 The winding number (corresponding to an integer of  can be used to prove the fundamental theorem of algebra, which states that every non-constant complex polynomial has a zero.
 The fact that  implies the Brouwer fixed point theorem that every continuous map from the -dimensional ball to itself has a fixed point.
 The stable homotopy groups of spheres are important in singularity theory, which studies the structure of singular points of smooth maps or algebraic varieties.
 The fact that the third stable homotopy group of spheres is cyclic of order 24, first proved by Vladimir Rokhlin, implies Rokhlin's theorem that the signature of a compact smooth spin 4-manifold is divisible by 16.
More precisely, there is an injective map

This is an isomorphism unless  is of the form , in which case the image has index 1 or 2.
 The Kervaire invariant problem, about the existence of manifolds of Kervaire invariant 1 in dimensions   can be reduced to a question about stable homotopy groups of spheres. For example, knowledge of stable homotopy groups of degree up to 48 has been used to settle the Kervaire invariant problem in dimension .
 The Barratt–Priddy theorem says that the stable homotopy groups of the spheres can be expressed in terms of the plus construction applied to the classifying space of the symmetric group, leading to an identification of K-theory of the field with one element with stable homotopy groups.

Table of homotopy groups
Tables of homotopy groups of spheres are most conveniently organized by showing .

The following table shows many of the groups . The stable homotopy groups are highlighted in blue, the unstable ones in red. Each homotopy group is the product of the cyclic groups of the orders given in the table, using the following conventions:
 The entry "⋅" denotes the trivial group.
 Where the entry is an integer, the homotopy group is the cyclic group of that order (generally written ).
 Where the entry is ∞, the homotopy group is the infinite cyclic group, .
 Where entry is a product, the homotopy group is the cartesian product (equivalently, direct sum) of the cyclic groups of those orders. Powers indicate repeated products.

Table of stable homotopy groups
The stable homotopy groups  are the products of cyclic groups of the infinite or prime power orders shown in the table. (For largely historical reasons, stable homotopy groups are usually given as products of cyclic groups of prime power order, while tables of unstable homotopy groups often give them as products of the smallest number of cyclic groups.) The main complexity is in the 2-, 3-, and 5-components: For , the -components in the range of the table are accounted for by the -homomorphism and are cyclic of order  if  divides  and 0 otherwise. The mod 8 behavior of the table comes from Bott periodicity via the J-homomorphism, whose image is underlined.

References

Notes

Sources
 . See also .
 .
 .
 .
 .
 .
 .
 .

 .

 .
 .
 .
  Also see the corrections in 

 
 .

 .
Pontrjagin, Lev, Smooth manifolds and their applications in homotopy theory American Mathematical Society Translations, Ser. 2, Vol. 11, pp. 1–114 (1959)
 .
 .
 .
 .
 .

 .
 .

General algebraic topology references
 .
 .

Historical papers
 .
 .
 .

External links
 
 
  in MacTutor History of Mathematics archive.
  in MacTutor History of Mathematics archive.

Homotopy theory
Spheres